The Second Step: Chapter Two is the second extended play (EP) by South Korean boy band Treasure. The EP was released by YG Entertainment on October 4, 2022.

This release marks Treasure’s first as a 10-member group as Bang Ye Dam and Mashiho were on a then temporary hiatus at the time and then subsequently left the group on November 8, 2022.

Background 
At the dawn on September 1, 2022, YG Entertainment announced Treasure would release its second extended play (EP), The Second Step: Chapter Two, which will be released on October 4.
Their second Japanese extended play, entitled with the same name will be released on November 30, 2022.

Track listing

Charts

Weekly charts

Monthly charts

Year-end charts

Certifications

Release history

References 

2022 EPs
Korean-language EPs
Treasure (band) EPs
YG Entertainment EPs